Watford is a constituency represented in the House of Commons of the UK Parliament since 2019 by Conservative Party MP Dean Russell.

History
Before the Redistribution of Seats Act 1885 the area was part of the three-seat constituency of Hertfordshire. Upon this act, it took up the western division of the county; however, later seats such as South West Hertfordshire, established in 1950, have reduced its reach, as settlements in those areas, and Watford itself, have grown.

Political history
The seat has been a bellwether of the national result since February 1974, and since 1945 has only voted against the winning party twice: in 1951 and 1970. Watford saw considerable Liberal Democrat opposition in 2005, achieving second place, taking many Labour votes with the Conservative candidate close behind.

Before the 2010 general election it was a three-way marginal seat in which local Tories, Labour supporters and Liberal Democrats aimed to garner support for their candidate. This election in Watford was won by Richard Harrington (Con) with 34.9% of the vote. The Liberal Democrats narrowly missed out on the seat with 32.4% of the vote and the defeat for Labour's candidate, Claire Ward, was a pronounced change with 26.7% of the vote.

In 2015, the result saw a significantly increased majority for Harrington of more than 9,000 votes over Labour, whilst the Liberal Democrats fell back to third. The 2017 election saw Labour significantly cut the Conservative majority to 2,092. Harrington retired at the 2019 election, when a new Conservative candidate, Dean Russell, increased the majority to 4,433 over Labour.

Prominent frontbenchers
Dennis Herbert was Deputy Speaker from 1931 to 1943.

Major John Freeman was only a third-tier (junior) minister in the War Office as MP. His later unusually prominent positions in diplomacy led to his being appointed a member of the Privy Council and thereby being Rt Hon as of 1966.

Tristan Garel-Jones was Minister for Europe for three years of the Major ministry.

Both Herbert and Garel-Jones opted as peers in later life to use Watford as the territorial designation of their peerages.

Constituency profile 
Watford has a considerable service sector economy, with several notable headquarters, and engineering, trade-craft, and distribution in its economy. However, it is also a commuter town to the City of London. British Waterways, J D Wetherspoon, Camelot Group, Iveco, manufacturers of commercial vehicles; part of Balfour Beatty; Bathstore, the largest bathroom retailer in the UK; construction firm Taylor Woodrow; and Mothercare are the largest of these. The borough is also the UK base of many multinationals including C. H. Robinson, Total Oil, TK Maxx, Costco, Vinci and Beko appliances. International golf tournaments such as the 2006 World Golf Championship have taken place at The Grove hotel.

Workless claimants who were registered jobseekers were in November 2012 lower than the national average of 3.8%, at 3.0% of the population based on a statistical compilation by The Guardian.

Boundaries and boundary changes 

1885–1918: Parts of the Sessional Division of Watford and Dacorum.

The constituency was established by the Redistribution of Seats Act 1885 (which followed on from the Third Reform Act) as one of four Divisions of the abolished three-member Parliamentary County of Hertfordshire, and was formally named as the Western or Watford Division of Hertfordshire.  It included the towns of Watford, Rickmansworth, Hemel Hempstead, Berkhamsted and Tring.

1918–1950: The Urban Districts of Bushey, Chorleywood, Rickmansworth, and Watford, and the Rural District of Watford parishes of Aldenham, Rickmansworth Rural and Watford Rural.

Aldenham transferred from St Albans.  Northern half of constituency, including Hemel Hempstead, Berkhamsted and Tring transferred to the new Hemel Hempstead Division.

1950–1983: Reconstituted as a Borough Constituency comprising the Municipal Borough of Watford.  Remainder of the constituency formed the bulk of the new County Constituency of South West Hertfordshire.

1983–1997: The Borough of Watford, the District of Three Rivers wards of Abbots Langley and Leavesden, and the District of St Albans wards of Park Street and St Stephens.

Abbots Langley and Leavesden transferred from South West Hertfordshire and Park Street and St Stephens from the abolished County Constituency of South Hertfordshire.

1997–present: The Borough of Watford, and the District of Three Rivers wards of Abbots Langley, Carpenders Park, Langleybury, Leavesden, and Oxhey Hall.

Three wards further wards in the Three Rivers District transferred from South West Hertfordshire.  Park Street and St Stephens transferred to St Albans.

The constituency comprises the whole of the Borough of Watford, together with five wards from Three Rivers District. Two of the Three Rivers wards, Carpenders Park and Oxhey Hall, are to the south of Watford town and include mostly prosperous, elevated, commuter villages. The remaining three, Abbots Langley, Langleybury and Leavesden, are to the north of Watford, the first of which is a large village, and is mixed in character and levels of income.

Members of Parliament

Elections

Elections in the 2010s

Background to Conservative candidates
In July 2007 former candidate Ali Miraj, a candidate for Aberavon in 2001, was dropped from the candidates list by the Conservative Party after he complained about David Cameron's leadership style and allegedly demanded a peerage. The public selected his former campaign manager Ian Oakley, who had been a candidate for Newport East in 2001 in the first Open Primary to be organised by the Conservative Party in November 2006. In July 2008, Oakley, withdrew candidature after being arrested for conducting a campaign of harassment against the local Liberal Democrats, for which he was convicted and given an 18-week suspended prison sentence and 12-month supervision order on 13 October 2008.

In December 2008 Watford Conservative Association selected a new candidate, Richard Harrington.

Elections in the 2000s

Elections in the 1990s

Elections in the 1980s

Elections in the 1970s

Elections in the 1960s

Elections in the 1950s

Elections in the 1940s

Elections in the 1930s

Elections in the 1920s

Elections in the 1910s

Election results 1885–1918

Elections in the 1880s

Elections in the 1890s

Elections in the 1900s

Elections in the 1910s

General Election 1914–15:

Another General Election was required to take place before the end of 1915. The political parties had been making preparations for an election to take place and by July 1914, the following candidates had been selected; 
Unionist: Arnold Ward
Liberal: Hedley Le Bas

See also 
Parliamentary constituencies in Hertfordshire

Notes

References

Parliamentary constituencies in Hertfordshire
Constituencies of the Parliament of the United Kingdom established in 1885
Politics of Watford
Politics of Three Rivers District